The Italian word luogotenente (plural luogotenenti) is an etymological parallel to lieutenant, deriving from the Latin locum tenens "holding a place", i.e. someone who fills a position instead of another, as a substitute, deputy, et cetera.

It has a few specific historical uses:

Military post 
The knightly officer who is in daily command of the Grand Master's own regimental company, to which the famigliari (closest personal staff) belonged.

Civilian administrator
It was also the governor (elsewhere other titles, such as provveditore, were used) for the Venetian Republic on the island of Cyprus, which it bought from its last Crusader king from the house of Lusignan, usually for a two-year term, until the Turks captured it in 1570. Besides him the military command was entrusted to a capitano ('captain', de facto military governor), from 1480 to 1571 (when Famagusta, the last fortress, fell).

Compound and derived titles

In the Neapolitan Two Sicilies Kingdom there was a Luogotenente generale dei reali domini al di là del Faro meaning Lieutenant-general of the royal domains beyond the Lighthouse, i.e. the Governor appointed by the King for Sicily (Statute of 11 December 1816).
1816 Niccolò Filangieri, prince of Cutò
1817 Francis, duke of Calabria
1820 Diego Naselli d'Aragona
1820 - 1821 Pietro Colletta, then Vito Nunziante
1821 Niccolò Filangieri, prince of Cutò
1824 - 1830 Pietro Ugo, marchese delle Favare
1830 - 1835 Prince Leopold, Count of Syracuse
1835 - 1837 Antonio Lucchesi-Palli, prince of Campofranco
1840 - 1848  Lt.-Gen. Luigi Nicola De Majo, duke of San Pietro
1848 - 1855  General Carlo Filangieri, prince of Satriano, duke of Taormina
1855 - 1860  Paolo Ruffo, prince of 
1860 General Ferdinando Lanza

Austria-Hungary 
Imperiale Regio Luogotenente was the official title for imperial-royal stadtholders in Austro-Hungarian crown lands using Italian as an official language, such as Dalmatia, Lombardo-Venetia (two luogotenenti, one each for Lombardy and Venetia), Gorizia and Gradisca, Istria and the Imperial Free City of Trieste, with the latter three lands combined under the one luogotenente of the Littoral. The title was in use between 1849 and 1918. Its equivalents in other official languages were namjesnik (Croatian), místodržitel (Czech), Statthalter (German), helytartó (Hungarian), namiestnik (Polish) or namesnik (Slovenian).

Kingdom of Sardinia and Kingdom of Italy 

In the Savoy dynasty's Kingdom of Piedmont-Sardinia and later united Kingdom of Italy, when the King was away from his office for some reason (e.g. to follow the war on the battlefield) he could appoint a Luogotenente Generale del Regno (Lieutenant-general of the realm) (chosen from members of royal family) to carry out some of the King's duties as a Viceroy.

It happened in 1848, when king Charles Albert reached the battlefield in Lombardia; Eugenio Savoia-Carignano was 'Luogotenente Generale del Regno' and it was up to him to announce the year after that the defeated king abdicated and succession passed to his son Vittorio Emanuele II. Eugenio Savoia-Carignano covered again the same role in 1859 and in 1866 when Victor Emmanuel II was involved in the second and third War of Independence. Finally in 1860/1861 he was appointed Luogotenential duties but limited to Toscana and to southern Italy, when those regions passed under the Kingdom of Sardinia.

Again on 25 May 1915 during World War I when King Victor Emmanuel III, leaving Rome in order to reach the war headquarters in North Italy and to assume Supreme War Command, he appointed his uncle, Tomaso di Savoia Duca di Genova, 'Luogotenente Generale del Regno' with delegate powers for ordinary and urgent administration (excluding grave importance affairs) until 1919.

Near the end of World War 2, the same King appointed his son, Umberto, as 'Luogotenente Generale del Regno' under Allied and Italian pressure. It was believed that Victor Emmanuel was too compromised by his earlier support of the fascist regime to have any further role in state affairs.

References
WorldStatesmen - here Cyprus

Military ranks
Gubernatorial titles
Italian words and phrases